Faceless is an EP by American band Impetigo.

Track listing
"Sinister Urge" - 6:16 (intro from the serial killer Joseph Kallinger interviewed by Geraldo Riveria)
"Faceless" - 1:46
"Dis-Organ-Ized" - 3:07
"Bloody Pit of Horror" - 2:42 (intro from the movie Bloody Pit of Horror, 1965) Also includes an outro prank called name "Mortado.

Notes
"Mortado" is a cassette tape bonus track.

External links 

 
 

Impetigo (band) albums
1991 EPs